K. V. Anoop, b. 1972, d. 2014 (aged ), was a Mathrubhumi `Star & Style' chief sub editor and a well known short story writer in Malayalam. He joined Mathrubhumi in 1997 as sub editor.

Works
His literary works include 
 Anandapathuvinte Prasangangal
 Kazhchakkulla Vibhavangal (collection of short stories)*
 Ammadeivangalude Bhoomi (novel)
 Maradona: Deivam, Chekuthan
 Rakthasakshi (a biography) 
 Lionel Messi: Tharodayathinte Kadha.

Awards 
 His novel Ammadeivangalude Bhoomi won the Uroob award in 1992.
 He received the Muttathu Varkey Foundation award (1994)
 The Ankanam-E P Sushama Memorial Endowment (2006) 
 The Mundoor Krishnankutty award (2011).

References

1972 births
2014 deaths
Indian newspaper editors
Indian male short story writers
Malayalam short story writers
Writers from Kerala
20th-century Indian short story writers
20th-century Indian male writers